Hypselodoris dollfusi is a species of colourful sea slug or dorid nudibranch, a marine gastropod mollusc in the family Chromodorididae. After being described initially in 1933 by Pruvot-Fol, this species was not seen again until its rediscovery in 2000 in the Sea of Khorfakkan, United Arab Emirates.

Distribution
This nudibranch is found in the Gulf of Suez, the Gulf of Aqaba and the Northern Indian Ocean.

Description
Hypselodoris dollfusi has a white body and a yellow edged mantle. There are very prominent red-ringed purple spots on its dorsum. The gills and rhinophores are white, lined with red. There are slight colour variations among individuals in this species. This nudibranch can reach a total length of at least 50 mm.

References

Chromodorididae
Gastropods described in 1933
Taxa named by Alice Pruvot-Fol